Terror Trail is a 1946 American Western film directed by Ray Nazarro and starring Charles Starrett. The film's sets were designed by the art director Charles Clague. It was shot at the Iverson Ranch.

Main cast
 Charles Starrett as Steve Haverley / The Durango Kid 
 Barbara Pepper as Karen Kemp - the Louisville Lady 
 Ozie Waters as Ozie Waters 
 Smiley Burnette as Smiley Burnette 
 Lane Chandler as Duke Catlett 
 George Chesebro as Henchman Drag
 Zon Murray as Bart Matson 
 Colorado Rangers  as Musicians

References

Bibliography
 Gene Freese. Jock Mahoney: The Life and Films of a Hollywood Stuntman. McFarland, 2013.

External links

1946 films
1946 Western (genre) films
American Western (genre) films
1940s English-language films
Columbia Pictures films
Films directed by Ray Nazarro
1940s American films